Stone Bridge is a bridge in Riga. It was called the October Bridge (Oktobra tilts) until 1992.

References

Bridges in Riga
Crossings of the Daugava River
Bridges completed in 1957
Bridges built in the Soviet Union